Parmotrema adspersum is a species of lichen in the family Parmeliaceae. It was originally described as a species of Parmelia by Edvard August Vainio in 1907. John Elix transferred it to Parmotrema in 2002, reasoning that its thick-walled ascospores (measuring 16–18 by 6–8 μm) are typical of that genus. Parmotrema adspersum is common in Thailand and the Philippines.

See also
List of Parmotrema species

References

adspersum
Lichen species
Lichens described in 1907
Lichens of Malesia
Taxa named by Edvard August Vainio
Lichens of Indo-China